The 2016–17 Penn State Lady Lions basketball team represented Pennsylvania State University during the 2016–17 NCAA Division I women's basketball season. The Lady Lions, led by 10th-year head coach Coquese Washington, played their home games at the Bryce Jordan Center as members of the Big Ten Conference. They finished the season of 21–11, 9–7 in Big Ten play to finish in a tie for sixth place. They lost in the second round of the Big Ten women's tournament to Minnesota. They were invited to the Women's National Invitation Tournament where they defeated Ohio and Fordham before losing to Virginia Tech in the third round.

Roster

Schedule

|-
!colspan=9 style="background:#1C3C6B; color:white;"| Exhibition

|-
!colspan=9 style="background:#1C3C6B; color:white;"| Non-conference regular season

|-
!colspan=9 style="background:#1C3C6B; color:white;"| Big Ten regular season

|-
!colspan=9 style="background:#1C3C6B; color:white;"| Big Ten Women's Tournament

|-
!colspan=9 style="background:#1C3C6B; color:white;"| WNIT

Source

Rankings

See also
 2016–17 Penn State Nittany Lions basketball team

References

Penn State Lady Lions basketball seasons
Penn State
Penn State
Penn State
2017 Women's National Invitation Tournament participants